P. cearensis may refer to:

 Parotocinclus cearensis, an armored catfish
 Phyllosticta cearensis, a sac fungus
 Pleurothallis cearensis, a neotropical orchid